The Cuban peso (in Spanish , ISO 4217 code: CUP) also known as , is the official currency of Cuba.

The Cuban peso historically circulated at par with the Spanish-American silver dollar from the 16th to 19th centuries, and then at par with the U.S. dollar from 1881 to 1959. The Castro government then introduced the socialist planned economy and pegged the peso to the Soviet ruble.

The Soviet Union's collapse in 1991 resulted in a Special Period of difficult economic adjustments for Cuba. From 1994 to 2020 the Cuban peso co-circulated with the Cuban convertible peso (ISO 4217 code "CUC"; colloquially pronounced "kook" in contrast to the CUP, often pronounced "koop"), which was convertible to and fixed against the U.S. dollar, and which was generally available to the public at a rate of US$1 = CUC 1 = CUP 25. State enterprises under the socialist planned economy, though, were entitled to exchange CUPs into CUCs and U.S. dollars at the official, subsidized rate of US$1 = CUC 1 = CUP 1, within prescribed limits.

From 1 January 2021 Cuba implemented the so-called "Day Zero" of monetary unification which abolished the Cuban convertible peso as well as the 1 CUP/USD rate for state enterprises. Henceforth the Cuban Peso became the only legal tender in Cuba, CUCs were converted at the rate of 24 CUP/CUC, and a single official exchange rate of 24 CUP/USD became applicable for both public and private transactions. However, demand for hard currency made these exchange rates unavailable in the informal market.

History

Before 1994 
Before 1857, Spanish and Spanish colonial reales circulated in Cuba. From 1857, banknotes were issued specifically for use on Cuba. These were denominated in pesos, with each peso worth 8 reales. From 1869, decimal notes were also issued denominated in centavos, with 100 centavos for each peso. In 1881, the peso was pegged to the US dollar at par. The currency continued to be issued only in paper form until 1915, when the first coins were issued.

In 1960, the peso lost value after the United States imposed an embargo against Cuba and the suspended sugar quota. Fidel Castro then introduced the socialist planned economy to Cuba with the Soviet Union as its new economic partner, and the Cuban peso was pegged to the Soviet ruble (at CUP 1 = US$1 = 4 old rubles before 1961, and afterwards at CUP 1 = US$1 = 0.90 SUR or new ruble).

Foreign exchange was a government monopoly under the socialist planned economy and could not be bought by the general public using Cuban pesos. Foreign currencies were therefore exchanged for coins of the Instituto Nacional de Turismo (INTUR) from 1981 to 1989 and for foreign exchange certificates of the Banco Nacional de Cuba from 1985. These coins or certificates were then used by visitors to buy some luxury goods not available for purchase in the national currency.

CUP and CUC, 1994-2020 

The Soviet Union's collapse in 1991 resulted in a difficult Special Period of economic adjustments which required the acquisition of foreign exchange in order to pay for petroleum and other imported goods which used to be easily procured from Cuba's former benefactor. The U.S. dollar was made legal tender to encourage much-needed hard currency to enter the economy, and the Cuban peso lost much of its value with its free market exchange rate plunging to as low as 125 CUP/USD.

In 1994 the Cuban convertible peso (CUC) was introduced at par with the US dollar and circulated alongside it. Partial revival of economic confidence then stabilized the Cuban peso to 23-25 CUPs to the CUC or USD, leading to the eventual fixing of exchange rates to US$1 = CUC 1 = CUP 25, which was available to the public from 2004-2005 and then from 2011-2020 through Cadecas (Casas de Cambio, or Bureau de Change; an exchange rate of 1.08 USD/CUC applied from 2005-2011).

On November 8, 2004, the Cuban government withdrew US dollars from circulation, citing the need to retaliate against further US sanctions. From 2004 to 2020 a 10% penalty or tax was applied when changing U.S. dollars to CUCs, which can be avoided by exchanging other currencies in Cadecas.

The revival of economic stability after the Special Period from 2000, however, also made possible the revival of features of the socialist planned economy, which involved the distribution of subsidized goods to the public, supported by a system of artificially pegged exchange rates; for instance:
 State-owned businesses earned and spent foreign exchange at the artificial or subsidized "official rate" of US$1 = CUC 1 = CUP 1.
 In turn, this made possible the sales of rationed goods to the public who earned salaries in the order of CUP 500 a month (worth only US$20 at the cash exchange rate, but could buy as much as US$500 worth of imported rationed goods, should they be available).
 Furthermore, the government also set different exchange rates for different enterprises (e.g. 10 CUP/CUC for the Mariel Special Development Zone).
 Cuban state employees were paid with basic salaries in CUPs, plus performance-based bonuses in CUCs.

Among the effects of this complicated system of exchange rates and subsidies were as follows:
 State companies were dis-incentivized from earning foreign exchange, but the public was incentivized to spend on subsidized imported goods.
 The CUC did not really have a firm backing in convertible currencies, as it can be easily printed to pay state companies and employees. Hence, neither CUC nor CUP was traded internationally, and their import and export is prohibited, so neither could be bought in advance outside Cuba.
 The Cuban economy was described as "dual-track", with the majority of citizens earning only CUPs and dependent on subsidized goods from ration stores, and with a minority earning much bigger salaries in CUCs and foreign exchange by catering to tourists.
 Shops and services were also "dual-track", with rationed goods sold in CUPs, imported or non-essential goods in CUCs, and locations aimed at foreign tourists charging CUC prices much higher than CUP prices paid by Cubans. 
 The system where U.S. dollars were worth CUP 1, CUP 10 or CUP 25 created substantial rent-seeking arbitrage opportunities and incentives to game the system for illicit profits.

This complicated system of multi-track exchange rates and markets, and the inequalities and rent-seeking it spawned, had long been a source of frustration alike to government bureaucrats and to a disgruntled public. In October 2013, the government announced its intention to abolish this multiple exchange rate system and to phase out the CUC. While detailed preparations and new rules were underway, many businesses started to accept both CUPs and CUCs at the rate of CUC 1 = CUP 25, and higher-value banknotes of CUP 200, 500 and 1000 were introduced. Fears over its financial fallout on state companies, however, delayed the "Day Zero" implementation of monetary unification by several years, until the drying up of foreign exchange reserves in 2020 due to the absence of tourists during the Covid-19 pandemic lockdowns made the further sale of subsidized dollars and goods unaffordable to the state.

Monetary unification, 2021 
On 10 December 2020, it was announced that "Day Zero" of monetary unification would occur on 1 January 2021, with a single official exchange rate of 24 CUP/USD applying to state companies and private individuals alike, and with the Cuban Convertible Peso to be retired and exchanged at the rate of 24 CUP/CUC until the end of 2021.

While technically described as a devaluation from the official 1 CUP/USD used in government and state business books, for the public it was viewed as state enterprises merely catching up to the reality of 24 CUP/USD that had always existed in the private sector.

Inflation
During 2021 it became difficult or impossible for private individuals and businesses to exchange CUP for hard currency at the official exchange rate of 24 CUP/USD. Demand for hard currency drove a black market in currency exchange, with US$1 being worth around 100 CUP by January 2022. By September 2022 the price of one U.S. dollar had risen to 190 CUP.

Coins

Before 1959 
In 1897 and 1898, pesos were issued by revolutionary forces promoting independence.  In 1915, cupro-nickel 1, 2 and 5 centavos, silver 10, 20 and 40 centavos and 1 peso, and gold 1, 2, 4, 5, 10 and 20 peso coins were introduced. These coins were designed by Charles E. Barber, who also designed the Barber dimes, quarters, half-dollars for the US. The coins were minted at the US mint at Philadelphia. The gold coins and 2 centavos were not produced after 1916, with the large star design 1 peso ceasing production in 1934. A new silver peso showing a woman, representing the Cuban Republic, beneath a star (the "ABC peso") was issued from 1934 to 1939.  Finally, a centennial of Jose Marti commemorative peso (also minted in 50, 25, and 1 centavos denominations) was produced in 1953.

Brass 1 and 5 centavos were issued in 1943, and with copper nickel composition sporadically from 1915 to 1958. Beginning in 1915, 2, 5, 10, 20 and 40 centavos coins were occasionally minted. The last 10, 20, and 40 centavo coins were produced in 1952; these were commemorative issues celebrating the fiftieth year of the republic. As mentioned above, in 1953, silver 25 and 50 centavos commemorative coins were also issued. These were the last silver coins issued for circulation.  The last US produced coin was the 1961 five centavo piece.

After 1959 
In 1962, cupro-nickel 20 and 40 centavos were introduced, followed, in 1963, by aluminium 1 and 5 centavos. In 1969, aluminium 20 centavos were introduced, followed by aluminium 2 centavos and brass 1 peso in 1983. Cupro-nickel 3 peso coins were introduced in 1990, with brass-plated-steel 1 peso and nickel-clad-steel 3 peso coins following in 1992. 40 centavo coins were withdrawn from circulation around July 2004 and are no longer accepted as payment. In 2017, the Banco Central de Cuba introduced bi-metallic 5 pesos coin (the difference is the denomination and composition (with a cupronickel ring and a brass center plug). Coins currently in common circulation are 5 and 20 centavos and 1, 3 and 5 pesos; 1 and 2 centavo coins are rarely seen (due to their tiny value) but are still valid.

INTUR coins, 1981-1989 
Between 1988 and 1989, the National Institute of Tourism ("INTUR") issued "Visitors' Coinage" for use by tourists. In 1981, cupro-nickel 5, 10, 25 and 50 centavos and 1 peso were introduced, followed in 1988 by aluminium 1, 5, 10, 25 and 50 centavos. The INTUR coins were demonetized on October 15, 2001 and were replaced by convertible pesos (CUC).

CUC coins, 1994-2020 
The convertible peso was also divided into 100 centavos. In 1994, coins were introduced in denominations of 5, 10, 25, and 50 centavos and 1 peso in nickel-plated steel. The rare bimetallic 5-peso coin was introduced in 1999, followed by the 1-centavo coin in 2000. These CUC coins co-circulated with CUP coins, with both types of coin distinguishable by differences in their color (mostly nickel-plated steel for CUCs, versus aluminum or brass for CUPs) as well as the octagonal shape visible in the outer round rim of all CUC coins.

Banknotes

Before 1959 
Under the Spanish Administration, the  introduced Cuba's first issue of banknotes in 1857 in denominations of 50, 100, 300, 500 and 1,000 dollars. The 25 peso denomination was introduced in 1867, and the 5 and 10 peso denominations in 1869. During the Ten Years' War, notes were issued dated 1869 in the name of the Republic of Cuba in denominations of 50 centavos, 1, 5, 10, 50, 500 and 1000 pesos.

In 1872, 5, 10, 25 and 50 centavo, and 1 and 3 peso notes were introduced by the Banco Español de la Habana. In 1891, the Treasury issued notes for 5, 10, 20, 50, 100 and 200 pesos.

In 1905, the National Bank of Cuba issued notes for 1, 2, 5 and 50 pesos. However, the 1905 banknotes were not issued (source: Pick's catalog) In 1934, the Government introduced silver certificates in denominations of 1, 5, 10, 20 and 50 pesos, followed by 100 pesos in 1936 and 500 and 1000 pesos in 1944.

Silver certificates

During the latter half of 1933, Cuba passed a series of laws to enact the production of Silver certificates (Certificado De Plata). Cuban silver certificates were designed, engraved, and printed by the US Treasury's Bureau of Engraving and Printing from 1934 to 1949 and circulated in Cuba between 1935 and the early 1950s. The eight series of notes were dated 1934, 1936, 1936A, 1938, 1943, 1945, 1948, and 1949 and ranged from one peso to 100 pesos. A Cuban representative was on-site in Washington DC to consult and approve designs.

Banco Nacional de Cuba (National Bank of Cuba)
In 1949, the Banco Nacional de Cuba resumed paper money production, introducing notes in denominations of 1, 5, 10 and 20 pesos that year, followed by notes in denominations of 50, 100, 500, 1000 and 10,000 pesos in 1950. Denominations above 100 pesos were not continued.

In January 1961, after introduction of the socialist planned economy, all previous bank notes were demonetized, with new banknotes, printed in Czechoslovakia, placed into circulation. Three-peso notes were added in 1983.

Banco Central de Cuba (Central Bank of Cuba)
In 1997, the functions of Banco Nacional as a central bank, including issuing notes and coins, were transferred to a newly created entity, the Central Bank of Cuba. This is the Cuban centre of economics.

The 1961 bank notes were demonetized on May 1, 2002. 200, 500, and 1000 peso notes were (re-)introduced in 2015. Banknotes currently in circulation are 1, 3, 5, 10, 20, 50, 100, 200, 500, and 1000 pesos. This banknote series is the only valid currency after the 2021 monetary unification when the convertible peso was retired.

Foreign Exchange Certificates, 1985 
In 1985, the Banco Nacional de Cuba issued foreign exchange certificates in denominations of 1, 3, 5, 10, 20, 50 and 100 pesos (not equivalent to the CUP). After 1994 these were replaced by the CUC or the convertible peso.

CUC banknotes, 1994-2020 

From 1994 to 2020 the Banco Nacional de Cuba and Banco Central de Cuba issued CUC banknotes in denominations of 1, 3, 5, 10, 20, 50 and 100 pesos. These CUC banknotes co-circulated with CUP banknotes, but despite the huge 25:1 ratio in their values, they were distinguishable by the fact that CUC notes featured monuments, while CUP notes featured portraits.

Exchange rates
Commercial bank exchange rates are published on their Facebook page by the Cuban bank, Banco Metropolitano.

See also
 Cuban convertible peso
 Central banks and currencies of the Caribbean
 Economy of Cuba
 Demurrage (currency)

References

Notes

Sources

External links
Cuba Currency Guide—One country, two currencies.
Cuban Bank Notes
The banknotes of Cuba (incl. FEC) 

Economy of Cuba
1857 introductions
Currencies of the Caribbean
1857 establishments in the Spanish Empire